Idhu Oru Thodar Kathai is a 1987 Indian Tamil-language film directed by Anu Mohan. The film stars Mohan, Amala and Rekha.

Cast 

Mohan as Ravi
Amala as Sumathi
Rekha as Radha
 Goundamani
 Senthil
 V. Gopalakrishnan
 Ra. Sankaran
 G. Srinivasan
 Kumarimuthu
 Ramnath
 Joker Thulasi
 Jai Seetharaman
 Sukumari
 Kamala Kamesh
 Vijayachandrika

Production
Anu Mohan, an erstwhile assistant of R. Sundarrajan, made his directorial debut with this film. Sundarrajan also wrote the story and dialogues for the film.

Soundtrack
Soundtrack was composed by Gangai Amaran.
"Paadal Naan Paada" - S. P. Balasubrahmanyam 
"Hey Vennila" - SPB, S. Janaki
"Engum Idhayam" - S. P. Balasubrahmanyam, S. Janaki
"Site Adicha" - Malaysia Vasudevan
"Pillaikoru" - K. S. Chithra

Release and reception 
Idhu Oru Thodar Kathai was released on 11 April 1987. The Indian Express wrote, "Film is a world apart. Money is needed to translate ideas on to celluloid, and again, lucre is a dominating, if not the only preoccupation of most of the people who matter in films. So much so, creativity and close-to-life ideas tend to be crushed under the iron feet of the worshippers of Mammon. That's exactly why a film like Idhu Oru Thodarkadhai makes you happy."

References

External links 
 

1987 films
1980s Tamil-language films
Indian drama films
Films scored by Gangai Amaran
1987 directorial debut films